Silk Hope is an unincorporated community in Chatham County, in the U.S. state of Georgia.

History
The community was named in the founders' hopes a silk textile industry would thrive here.

References

Unincorporated communities in Georgia (U.S. state)
Unincorporated communities in Chatham County, Georgia